Giovanni Invernizzi may refer to:

 Giovanni Invernizzi (footballer born 1931) (1931–2005), Italian international football player, later Internazionale Milan manager
 Giovanni Invernizzi (footballer born 1963), Italian football player and coach
 Giovanni Invernizzi (rower) (1926–1986), Italian Olympic champion rower